The 1985 European Ladies' Team Championship took place 3–7 July at Stavanger Golf Club in Hafrsfjord, Norway. It was the 14th women's golf amateur European Ladies' Team Championship.

Venue 
The hosting club was founded in 1956. The course, constructed by English course architect Fred Smith and situated in Hafrsfjord, 5 kilometres from the city center of Stavanger in Rogaland county, Norway, was completed with 18 holes in 1963, making it the second oldest 18-hole-course in Norway.

The championship course was set up with par 71.

Format 
All participating teams played two qualification rounds of stroke-play with six players, counted the five best scores for each team.

The eight best teams formed flight A, in knock-out match-play over the next three days. The teams were seeded based on their positions after the stroke-play. The first placed team was drawn to play the quarter final against the eight placed team, the second against the seventh, the third against the sixth and the fourth against the fifth. In each match between two nation teams, two 18-hole foursome games and five 18-hole single games were played. Teams were allowed to switch players during the team matches, selecting other players in to the afternoon single games after the morning foursome games. Games all square after 18 holes were declared halved, if the team match was already decided.

The seven teams placed 9–15 in the qualification stroke-play formed Flight B, to play similar knock-out play to decide their final positions.

Teams 
15 nation teams contested the event. Each team consisted of six players.

Players in the leading teams

Other participating teams

Winners 
Team England lead the opening 36-hole qualifying competition, with a score of 32 over par 742, ten strokes ahead of team France. 

Tied individual leaders in the 36-hole stroke-play competition was Helen Alfredsson, Sweden, and Stefania Croce, Italy, each with a score of 2-over-par 144, two strokes ahead of four players at tied third.

England won the gold, earning their sixth title, beating team Italy in the final 4–3. Team Switzerland, for the first time on the podium, earned third place, beating Sweden 5–1 in the bronze match.

Results 
Qualification round

Team standings

Individual leaders

 Note: There was no official award for the lowest individual score.

Flight A

Bracket

Final games

Flight B

Bracket

Final standings

Sources:

See also 
 Espirito Santo Trophy – biennial world amateur team golf championship for women organized by the International Golf Federation.
 European Amateur Team Championship – European amateur team golf championship for men organised by the European Golf Association.

References

External links 
 European Golf Association: Results

European Ladies' Team Championship
Golf tournaments in Norway
European Ladies' Team Championship
European Ladies' Team Championship
European Ladies' Team Championship